{{Infobox road
|country=BEL
|maint=the Roads and Traffic Agency of the Flemish government
|type=A
|route=1
|map=Snelweg_A1_Belgie.png
|length_km=70
|direction_a = North
|terminus_a  =  at Dutch border
|junction    =  1a Transportzone Meer
 1 Meer 
 2 Loenhout 
 3 
 4 Sint-Job-in-'t-Goor 
 5 Kleine Bareel 
 Antwerpen-Noord junction 
 Antwerpen-Zuid junction 
 6 Wilrijk 
 6a U.Z.A. 
 7 Kontich 
 8 Rumst 
 9 Mechelen-Noord 
 10 Mechelen-Zuid B101 
 11 Zemst 
 12 Vilvoorde-Luchthavenlaan 
||direction_b = South
|terminus_b  =  Machelen junction 
|e-road=
}}
The A1 is a major Belgian motorway linking the capital Brussels to Antwerp and then to the Dutch border turning to the A16 in the Netherlands. The motorway is a part of the E19.

 The central reservation 
Remarkable between Antwerp and Brussels is the exceptional broad central reservation (40 m wide over a length of about 35 km). The original plans for the A1 dating from the beginning of the 1970s were based on unrealistic growth scenarios. The central reservation was meant for eventual lanes for traffic from Brussels to Antwerp (and vice versa), with only ramps in Mechelen (which explains the complex interchange in Mechelen-North and South). Only between Antwerp and Kontich, the middle lanes were built with 2 x 2 lanes, but these were merged in 2011.

The rest of the track was not built in spite of the increased traffic. Because the Brussels Ring and Antwerp Ring can already no longer manage the traffic at certain times, the "super motorway" would do nothing but move the traffic jams from the A1 to the interchanges near Antwerp and Brussels. This broad central reservation, including the unnecessarily long bridges over the A1, along with the partly unused interchange in Mechelen and the lamps that light the unused central reservation, is an urban planning blunder. The unused lamps were taken out in 2006.

Shortly after the Dutroux affair, in 1997, trees have been planted on a part of the central reservation in commemoration of killed children, the so-called "Witte Kinderbos" ("White Children's Forest").

On the central reservation between Zemst and Brussels, a railway has been built between 2007 and 2012 that is part of the new high-speed connection from Antwerp to Brussels Airport, known as the Diabolo project. Thereby, a part of the Witte Kinderbos'' disappeared and was replaced by green spaces between the A1 and the adjacent residential areas. The biggest part of the forest is between Mechelen and Antwerp and remained.

Pictures

External links 

 (Dutch) History of the A1-E19 on Wegen-Routes.be
 (Dutch) Information about the broad central reservation on the website of the Flemish government

Motorways in Belgium